Leland Gaither Allen (January 12, 1915 – May 20, 1969) was an American sportswriter and historian on the subject of baseball. He was known for an accessible writing style that made history more interesting, typically focusing on the people in the stories as much as the events.

A native of Cincinnati, Ohio, Allen was the son of U.S. Representative Alfred Gaither Allen. After attending Kenyon College as a psychology major, spending a semester at the Columbia University School of Journalism, and working for the Cincinnati Reds as a publicity director and traveling secretary, he began his writing career with the Cincinnati Enquirer, and wrote the Cincinnati entry in the Putnam Publishing series on the Major League Baseball teams.

He authored other books, including histories of the National League and American League, the World Series, and a volume about the Giants-Dodgers rivalry. He was also a frequent contributor to The Sporting News, including articles to their annual publications as well as a weekly column called "Cooperstown Corner". In the early 1940s Allen assisted Waite Hoyt on Cincinnati Reds radio broadcasts.

From 1959 until his death, he was the historian at the Baseball Hall of Fame, succeeding Ernest Lanigan. In that capacity, and with his substantial collection of biographical information on ballplayers (continuing Lanigan's work), he had a great deal of input to the first edition of the famous MacMillan Baseball Encyclopedia which was published in the same year he died.

Although Allen had been inspired as a youth by his Hall of Fame predecessor's Baseball Cyclopedia, he was not the "figger filbert" that Lanigan was. However, they did share a common interest in the personal stories of the ballplayers. This quote from Allen's SABR profile highlights their differences and similarities. The first sentence is polar opposite to Lanigan's philosophy, the remainder is right in line with Lanigan's work: "I care very little for statistics as such. My concern is the players. Who are these men? What are they? What problems have they faced? Where are they now?"

In addition to biographies, Allen was also a pioneer in gathering information about baseball parks, and published one of the first comprehensive lists of major league ballparks and their locations, in the 1961 edition of one of The Sporting News publications.

He died of a heart attack in Syracuse, New York while on a road trip researching a subject for a book.

References

External links
SABR biography

1915 births
1969 deaths
20th-century American non-fiction writers
American sportswriters
Baseball writers
Cincinnati Reds announcers
Columbia University Graduate School of Journalism alumni
Kenyon College alumni
Writers from Cincinnati
The Cincinnati Enquirer people